Sweet Water Village (O'odham: S-iʼovĭ Shu:dagĭ) is a census-designated place (CDP) in Pinal County, Arizona, United States, located in the Gila River Indian Community. The population was 83 at the 2010 census.

Demographics 

As of the census of 2010, there were 83 people living in the CDP. The racial makeup of the CDP was 1% White, 98% Native American, and 1% from two or more races. 19% of the population were Hispanic or Latino of any race.

Notes

Census-designated places in Pinal County, Arizona
Gila River Indian Community